Kahn is a German derived surname, from the word for "small boat".

Kahn may also refer to:
Kahn (game browser), enabling online multiplayer of IPX compatible games over a TCP/IP network
Kahn's, an American meat processing and distribution company based in Ohio
Kahn, Iran (disambiguation), places in Iran
Kahn-e Bala (disambiguation), "upper Kahn", places in Iran
Kahn process networks (KPNs), a distributed model of computation in network communications 
Kähn, an alias of Joseph McGann, British record producer and DJ based in Bristol
Kahn Design, a British car modifier based in Bradford 
Kahn River, Indore, India 
The ICAO designation for Athens–Ben Epps Airport in Athens, a city in Clarke County, Georgia.

See also 
Kan (disambiguation)
Kaan (disambiguation)
Caan (disambiguation)